Don Walko (born February 24, 1953) was a Democratic member of the Pennsylvania House of Representatives for the 20th District. Walko was elected in 1994 and was in office until 2010. He resigned on January 3 after being elected a judge for the 5th District of the Allegheny County Court Common Pleas.

References

External links
Pennsylvania House of Representatives - Don Walko official PA House website
Biography, voting record, and interest group ratings at Project Vote Smart
Follow the Money - Don Walko
2006 2004 2002 2000 1998 campaign contributions
 official Party website

1953 births
Living people
Democratic Party members of the Pennsylvania House of Representatives
Pennsylvania district justices
Politicians from Pittsburgh
People from Westmoreland County, Pennsylvania